{{Automatic taxobox
| image = Garra Rufa.JPG
| image_caption = Doctor fish (Garra rufa)
| taxon = Garra
| authority = F. Hamilton, 1822
| type_species = Cyprinus (Garra) lamta
| type_species_authority = F. Hamilton, 1822
| synonyms =
Ageneiogarra Garman, 1912
Brachygramma Day, 1865
Discognathichthys Bleeker, 1860
Discognathus Heckel, 1843
Hemigrammocapoeta Pellegrin, 1927
Iranocypris Bruun & Kaiser, 1944
Lissorhynchus Bleeker, 1860
Mayoa Day, 1870
Platycara McClelland, 1838
Tylognathoides Tortonese, 1938
Typhlogarra <small>Trevawas, 1955</small>
}}Garra is a genus of fish in the family Cyprinidae. These fish are one example of the "log suckers", sucker-mouthed barbs and other cyprinids commonly kept in aquaria to keep down algae. The doctor fish of Anatolia and the Middle East belongs in this genus. The majority of the more than 140 species of garras are native to Asia, but about one-fifth of the species are from Africa (East, Middle and West, but by far the highest species richness in Ethiopia).

The genus was established by Francis Buchanan-Hamilton in 1822 as a subgenus of Cyprinus (which at that time was a "wastebin|basket genus" for carp-like cyprinids); though it didn't lead to an act of him to designate a type species by the time. However, as no other garras except the newly discovered G. lamta were known to science in 1822, this was designated as the type species by Pieter Bleeker in 1863. The garras and their closest relatives are sometimes placed in a subfamily Garrinae, but this seems hardly warranted. More often, this group is included in the Labeoninae, or together with these in the Cyprininae. In the former case, the garras are members of the labeonine tribe Garrini, in the latter they are in the subtribe Garraina of tribe Labeonini. The genus Discogobio is a close relative.

Description and ecology
These species are slim cyprinids with a flat belly and a sucking mouth; their shape indicates that they are at least in tendency rheophilic. They are distinguished from other cyprinids by a combination of features: As in their closest relatives, their lower lip is expanded at its posterior rim to form a round or oval sucking pad, the vomero-palatine organ is much reduced or completely lost, the pectoral fins have at least the first two rays enlarged and usually unbranched, the supraethmoid is wider than long when seen from above, and the cleithrum is narrow and elongated to the front.

From other Garrini (or Garraina), the genus Garra can be distinguished as follows: their pharyngeal teeth are arranged in three rows (like 2,4,5–5,4,2), the dorsal fin has 10-11 rays and starts slightly anterior to the pelvic fins, while the anal fin starts well behind the pelvic fins and has 8-9 rays. As far as is known, the diploid karyotype of garras is 2n = 50.

Garras are not or barely noticeably sexually dimorphic and generally cryptically coloured benthic freshwater fish. Five species in the genus (G. dunsirei, G. lorestanensis, G. tashanensis, G. typhlops and some populations of G. barreimiae) are cave-adapted, lacking pigmentation and/or eyes. Garras are omnivorous, eating alga, plankton and small invertebrates that they suck off substrate like rocks or logs. The food is scraped off with the sharp keratinized borders of the jaws and ingested via suction, created by contracting and relaxing the buccopharynx. As typical for Cypriniformes, the garras lack a stomach entirely, their oesophagus leading directly to the sphincter of the intestine. Different Garra species eat animal and vegetable matter in different proportions, which can – as typical for vertebrates – usually be recognized by the length of their intestine compared to related species: more herbivorous species have a longer intestine. Indeed, intestinal length in this genus is remarkably constant within species and varies a lot between species, meaning that it is useful to distinguish species and that dietary shifts have played a significant role in the evolution of garras.

When the females are ready to spawn, they are markedly plump and swollen; the ripe roe may fill almost four-fifths of their body cavity. The testicles of reproductive males are large too. The average Garra egg is 1.77 mm in diameter and a clutch contains several hundred eggs – up to a thousand or so in large females. The breeding behaviour is generally not well known and breeding is not often achieved in the aquarium; presumably, like many of their relatives they migrate upstream or (if they otherwise inhabit lakes) into the rivers to spawn.

Species
These are the currently recognized species in this genus:

 Garra abhoyai Hora, 1921
 Garra aethiopica (Pellegrin, 1927)
 Garra allostoma T. R. Roberts, 1990
 Garra alticaputus Arunachalam, Nandagopal & Mayden, 2013 
 Garra amirhosseini Esmaeili, Sayyadzadeh, Coad & Eagderi, 2016 
 Garra annandalei Hora, 1921 
 Garra apogon (Norman, 1925)
 Garra arunachalami Johnson & Soranam, 2001
 Garra arunachalensis Nebeshwar &  Vishwanath, 2013 
 Garra arupi Nebeshwar, Vishwanath & D. N. Das, 2009
 Garra barreimiae Fowler & Steinitz, 1956
 Garra bibarbatus (Nguyen, 2001) 
 Garra bicornuta Narayan Rao, 1920 
 Garra bimaculacauda Thoni, Gurung & Mayden, 2016 
 Garra birostris Nebeshwar &  Vishwanath, 2013 
 Garra bisangulris Chen, Wu, & Xiao, 2010 
 Garra bispinosa E. Zhang, 2005
 Garra blanfordii (Boulenger, 1901)
 Garra borneensis (Vaillant, 1902)
 Garra bourreti (Pellegrin, 1928)
 Garra buettikeri Krupp, 1983
 Garra cambodgiensis (Tirant, 1883) (Cambodian logsucker)
 Garra ceylonensis Bleeker, 1863 (Ceylon logsucker)
 Garra chakpiensis Nebeshwar & Vishwanath, 2015 
 Garra chebera Habteselassie, Mikschi, Ahnelt & Waidbacher, 2010
 Garra chindwinensis Nongthombam Premananda, Kosygin, Bano Saidullah, 2017
 Garra compressus Kosygin & Vishwanath, 1998
 Garra congoensis Poll, 1959 
 Garra cornigera  Shangningam & Vishwanath, 2015 
 Garra cryptonema (G. H. Cui & Z. Y. Li, 1984) 
 Garra culiciphaga (Pellegrin, 1927) 
 Garra cyclostomata Đ. Y. Mai, 1978
 Garra cyrano Kottelat, 2000
 Garra dampaensis Lalronunga, Lalnuntluanga & Lalramliana, 2013 
 Garra dembecha Getahun & Stiassny, 2007
 Garra dembeensis (Rüppell, 1835) (Cameroon logsucker)
 Garra dulongensis (Chen, Pan, Kong & Yang, 2006)
 Garra dunsirei Banister, 1987
 Garra duobarbis Getahun & Stiassny, 2007
 Garra elegans (Günther, 1868) 
 Garra elongata Vishwanath & Kosygin, 2000 
 Garra emarginata Kurup & Radhakrishnan, 2011 
 Garra ethelwynnae Menon, 1958
 Garra fasciacauda Fowler, 1937
 Garra festai (Tortonese, 1939) 
 Garra fisheri (Fowler, 1937)
 Garra flavatra S. O. Kullander & F. Fang, 2004
 Garra fluviatilis Kangrang, Thoni, Mayden & Beamish, 2016 
 Garra fuliginosa Fowler, 1934
 Garra geba Getahun & Stiassny, 2007
 Garra ghorensis Krupp, 1982 
 Garra gotyla (J. E. Gray, 1830)
 Garra gracilis (Pellegrin & Chevey, 1936)
 Garra gravelyi (Annandale, 1919)
 Garra hainanensis Y. R. Chen & C. Y. Zheng, 1983
 Garra hindii (Boulenger, 1905)
 Garra hughi Silas, 1955 
 Garra ignestii (Gianferrari, 1925)
 Garra imbarbatus (Nguyen, 2001)
 Garra imberba Garman, 1912
 Garra imberbis (Vinciguerra, 1890)
 Garra incisorbis L. P. Zheng, J. X. Yang & X. Y. Chen, 2016 
 Garra jaldhakaensis, Kosygin, Bungdon Shangningam, Pratima Singh, Ujjal Das, 2021
 Garra jerdoni F. Day, 1867 
 Garra jordanica Hamidan, Geiger & Freyhof, 2014 
 Garra joshuai Silas, 1954
 Garra kalakadensis Rema Devi, 1993
 Garra kalpangi Nebeshwar, Bagra & D. N. Das, 2012 
 Garra kemali (Hankó, 1925) 
 Garra kempi Hora, 1921
 Garra khawbungi Arunachalam, Nandagopal & Mayden, 2014 
 Garra kimini Arunachalam, Nandagopal & Mayden, 2013 
 Garra lamta (F. Hamilton, 1822)
 Garra lancrenonensis Blache & Miton, 1960
 Garra lautior Banister, 1987
 Garra lissorhynchus (McClelland, 1842) 
 Garra litanensis Vishwanath, 1993
 Garra longchuanensis Q. Yu, X. Z. Wang, H. Xiong & S. P. He, 2016 
 Garra longipinnis Banister & M. A. Clarke, 1977
 Garra lorestanensis Mousavi-Sabet & Eagderi, 2016 
 Garra magnidiscus Tamang, 2013 
 Garra makiensis (Boulenger, 1904)
 Garra mamshuqa Krupp, 1983
 Garra manipurensis Vishwanath & Sarojnalini, 1988
 Garra mcclellandi (Jerdon, 1849) 
 Garra menderesensis (Küçük, Bayçelebi, Güçlü & Gülle, 2015) 
 Garra menoni Rema Devi & T. J. Indra, 1984
 Garra micropulvinus W. Zhou, X. F. Pan & Kottelat, 2005
 Garra mini Rahman, Mollah, Norén & Kullander, 2016
 Garra minimus Arunachalam, Nandagopal & Mayden, 2013 
 Garra mirofrontis X. L. Chu & G. H. Cui, 1987
 Garra mlapparaensis Kurup & Radhakrishnan, 2011 
 Garra mondica Sayyadzadeh, Esmaeili & Freyhof, 2015 
 Garra mullya (Sykes, 1839) 
 Garra naganensis Hora, 1921 
 Garra nambulica Vishwanath & Joyshree, 2005
 Garra namyaensis Shangningam & Vishwanath, 2012 Shangningam, B. & Vishwanath, W. (2012): Validation of Garra namyaensis Shangningam & Vishwanath, 2012 (Teleostei: Cyprinidae: Labeoninae). Ichthyological Exploration of Freshwaters, 23 (1): 10-10.
 Garra nana (Heckel, 1843) 
 Garra nasuta (McClelland, 1838) 
 Garra nethravathiensis Arunachalam & Nandagopal, 2014 
 Garra nigricauda Arunachalam, Nandagopal & Mayden, 2013 
 Garra nigricollis S. O. Kullander & F. Fang, 2004
 Garra nkhruletisis Nebeshwar & Vishwanath, 2015 
 Garra notata (Blyth, 1860) 
 Garra nujiangensis Z. M. Chen, S. Zhao & J. X. Yang, 2009
 Garra orientalis Nichols, 1925
 Garra ornata (Nichols & Griscom, 1917)
 Garra palaniensis Rema Devi & Menon, 1994
 Garra palaruvica Arunachalam, Raja, Nandagopal & Mayden, 2013 
 Garra paralissorhynchus Vishwanath & K. Shanta Devi, 2005
 Garra parastenorhynchus Thoni, Gurung & Mayden, 2016 
 Garra periyarensis K. C. Gopi, 2001
 Garra persica L. S. Berg, 1914
 Garra phillipsi Deraniyagala, 1933 (Phillips's garra)
 Garra platycephala Narayan Rao, 1920 
 Garra poecilura S. O. Kullander & F. Fang, 2004
 Garra poilanei Petit & T. L. Tchang, 1933
 Garra propulvinus S. O. Kullander & F. Fang, 2004
 Garra qiaojiensis H. W. Wu & Yao, 1977
 Garra quadratirostris Nebeshwar &  Vishwanath, 2013 
 Garra quadrimaculata (Rüppell, 1835)
 Garra rakhinica S. O. Kullander & F. Fang, 2004
 Garra regressus Getahun & Stiassny, 2007
 Garra robertsi Thoni & Mayden, 2015 
 Garra rossica (A. M. Nikolskii, 1900)
 Garra rotundinasus E. Zhang, 2006
 Garra rufa (Heckel, 1843) 
 Garra rupecula (McClelland, 1839) 
 Garra sahilia Krupp, 1983
 Garra salweenica Hora & Mukerji, 1934
 Garra sindhi Lyon, Geiger & Freyhof, 2016 
 Garra smarti Krupp & Budd, 2009
 Garra spilota S. O. Kullander & F. Fang, 2004
 Garra stenorhynchus Jerdon, 1849 
 Garra surendranathanii C. P. Shaji, L. K. Arun & P. S. Easa, 1996
 Garra surinbinnani Page, Ray, Tongnunui, Boyd & Randall, 2019
 Garra tamangi Gurumayum & Kosygin, 2016 
 Garra tana Getahun & Stiassny, 2007
 Garra tashanensis Mousavi-Sabet, Vatandoust, Fatemi & Eagderi, 2016
 Garra tengchongensis E. Zhang & Y. Y. Chen, 2002
 Garra theunensis Kottelat, 1998
 Garra tibanica Trewavas, 1941 
 Garra trilobata  Shangningam & Vishwanath, 2015 
 Garra tyao Arunachalam, Nandagopal & Mayden, 2014 
 Garra typhlops (Bruun & E. W. Kaiser, 1944) (Iran cave barb) 
 Garra variabilis (Heckel, 1843)
 Garra vittatula S. O. Kullander & F. Fang, 2004
 Garra waensis Lothongkham, Arbsuwan & Musikasinthorn, 2014 
 Garra wanae (Regan, 1914)
 Garra waterloti (Pellegrin, 1935)
 Garra yiliangensis'' H. W. Wu & Q. Z. Chen, 1977

References

 
Cyprinidae genera
Taxa named by Francis Buchanan-Hamilton
Taxonomy articles created by Polbot